Beckett Media is a media company that specializes in coverage of sports card and sports memorabilia markets. The company was founded in 1984 by James Beckett as Beckett Publications.

History
James Beckett was a statistics professor before launching Beckett Media. In the 1970s, Beckett was responsible for some of the baseball card industry's earliest price guides, which offered more detail on the prices of specific cards than the newsletters that had previously been read by collectors. He founded Beckett Publications in 1984.

In January 2005, Beckett sold the company to Apprise Media, which wanted to expand its niche and enthusiast media holdings. The company was renamed Beckett Media as part of the sale. On 26 January 2005, Apprise Media hired Peter A. Gudmundsson as the company CEO.

Less than four years after the Apprise Media acquisition, Beckett Media was rumored to again be for sale in May 2008, with five unspecified companies considering purchasing the company. In 2008, the company was sold to Eli Global, a multinational corporation based in Durham, North Carolina, founded in 1991 by Greg Lindberg.

In 2010, the company began an overhaul of its online presence. On 8 March 2010, the company announced that it was partnering with SeatGeek as part of its website enhancement. Through the partnership, sports ticket search engine SeatGeek links will be included on all of the site's major sports team and leagues pages that allow viewers to directly access SeatGeek's ticket search system for that team.

Products

Magazines
Beckett Media publishes price guides and other books related to collectibles and distributes sports memorabilia. One of the company's early publications was Beckett Baseball Card Monthly, which had a peak readership of around one million. In 2008, Beckett converted its four monthly price guides for football, baseball, hockey, and basketball cards, into seasonal titles. Beckett Sports Card Monthly became its only monthly sports related magazine with its premiere in April 2008.

The company also publishes four magazines covering non-sports collectible card games, such as Magic: The Gathering, and hobby/entertainment topics such as anime and manga. In 2005, the various titles had a combined circulation of 800,000 copies. In 2008, the circulation varies between 500,000 and 700,000, and the company began cutting back on its monthly publications to reduce overhead. While the plan was successful, it also earned the company flack from consumers and caused a continuing decrease in sales. In 2003, virtual pets site Neopets selected Beckett Media as the publisher of its new monthly Neopets: The Official Magazine. The bi-monthly magazine premiered in September 2003, and was canceled in January 2008 after 26 issues. Beckett replaced the issues remaining in pre-paid subscriptions with their new bi-monthly magazine, Plushie Pals. Aimed at plushie collectors, Plushie Pals includes pricing guides for a range of plushie lines, including Neopets, Webkinz, Shining Stars, TY Beanie Babies, and Pokémon. In October 2009, Beckett replaced Plushie Pals with a new magazine, FUN! Online Games, which focuses on various kid and family oriented online game sites, including Webkinz, Club Penguin, Neopets, Disney Online and Wizard 101. According to the company, in its first month it had 100,000 readers.

The company made its first foray into the video game arena in 2006, with the creation of Beckett Massive Online Gamer. The first issue was released in May 2006 and included information for players of various massively multiplayer online games (MMORGs), products related to the games, and articles on lifestyle and entertainment topics.

Internet sales
Beginning in 1995, Beckett used the internet to facilitate sales of collectibles and sports cards. The company had affiliations with dealers of collectibles, and its website contained a searchable inventory of products, which consumers were able to buy from the sellers through links on Beckett's site. As of 2005, $13 million worth of products were sold through this system, and 165 dealers had affiliations by the following year.

Sports card grading
The company's publications introduced an early grading system for cards, which provided a way to gauge their condition. Six levels were spelled out, from mint to poor condition. Beckett Media runs a sports card grading service, Beckett Grading Services, which is the exclusive grader and authenticator of Topps Vault trading cards. Beckett Media launched an autograph authentication company in 2016. The company, Beckett Authentication Services, is now considered one of the leading autograph authentication companies.

Fanspot.com
In November 2005, the company began working to create a social networking website for casual sports fans. In April 2006, they launched the resulting site, FanSpot.com, at the 2006 National Sports Collectors Convention. By the end of the month, the site had 1800 registered users. By the end of 2008 user activity on the site ceased completely, though most parts of the site were still active. By 2013, Fanspot had shut down.

References

External links
 
 Archived Beckett Price Guides on the Internet Archive

Beckett Media Ld
Baseball cards
Trading cards
Publishing companies established in 1984